is a retired Japanese weightlifter. He won a bronze medal in the bantamweight category at the 1984 Summer Olympics, which was combined with the world championships.

References

1960 births
Living people
Japanese male weightlifters
Olympic weightlifters of Japan
Weightlifters at the 1984 Summer Olympics
Olympic bronze medalists for Japan
Olympic medalists in weightlifting
Medalists at the 1984 Summer Olympics
20th-century Japanese people
21st-century Japanese people